704 Interamnia is a large F-type asteroid. With a mean diameter of around 330 kilometres, it is the fifth-largest asteroid, after Ceres, Vesta, Pallas and Hygiea. Its mean distance from the Sun is 3.067 AU. It was discovered on 2 October 1910 by Vincenzo Cerulli, and named after the Latin name for Teramo, Italy, where Cerulli worked. Its mass is probably between fifth and tenth highest in the asteroid belt, with a mass estimated to be 1.2% of the mass of the entire asteroid belt. Observations by the Very Large Telescope's SPHERE imager in 2017–2019, combined with occultation results, indicate that the shape of Interamnia may be consistent with hydrostatic equilibrium for a body of its density with a rotational period of 7.6 hours. (Its current period is 8.7 hours.) This suggests that Interamnia may have formed as an equilibrium body, and that impacts changed its rotational period after it fully solidified.

Characteristics

Although Interamnia is the largest asteroid after the "big four", it is a very little-studied body. It is easily the largest of the F-type asteroids, but until 2017-2019 there existed very few details of its internal composition or shape, and no light curve analysis has yet been done to determine the ecliptic coordinates of Interamnia's poles (and hence its axial tilt). Studies by the Very Large Telescope give an average diameter of about 332 km and found an ellipsoidal shape for Interamnia, similar to 4 Vesta; the resulting density calculation (1.98 ± 0.68 g·cm−3) is not precise enough to definitely infer Interamnia's composition, but the presence of hydrated materials at the surface and its overall spectral similarities to Ceres suggest that it is likely an icy body. The absence of an affiliated asteroid family implies that Interamnia has not suffered a giant impact within the past 3 billion years, in contrast to 4 Vesta and 10 Hygeia.

Its very dark surface and relatively large distance from the Sun means Interamnia can never be seen with 10x50 binoculars. At most oppositions its magnitude is around +11.0, which is less than the minimum brightness of Vesta, Ceres or Pallas. Even at a perihelic opposition its magnitude is only +9.9, which is over four magnitudes lower than Vesta.

Surface

There are no deep basins visible in the VLT images. Any large craters must have flat floors, consistent with an icy C/F-type composition.

Mass
Michalak's estimate depends on the masses of 19 Fortuna, 29 Amphitrite, and 16 Psyche; thus this mass was obtained assuming an incomplete dynamical model.

See also
List of Solar System objects by size

References

External links 
 Animation of Asteroid Interamnia taken on 1 & 2 April 2003
 Interamnia Occultations Observed before 2003
 (704) Interamnia: A transition object between a dwarf planet and a typical irregular-shaped minor body
 
 

Background asteroids
Interamnia
Interamnia
F-type asteroids (Tholen)
B-type asteroids (SMASS)
19101002
19101002
Objects observed by stellar occultation
Possible dwarf planets